Dipika O'Neill Joti (born 1967) is an Indian former actress.

Biography 
After moving to London in the late 1990s, Joti played the role of the Chalactan Jedi Master Depa Billaba in Star Wars: Episode I – The Phantom Menace and Episode II – Attack of the Clones. Joti has also appeared in the TV series Gimme 6, in which she plays the role of the Mayor of the town.

Upon arriving in London, Joti added O'Neill as a middle name. She was given advice that adopting a western name would lead to a greater chance of landing roles.

Joti has since returned to India, where she currently teaches meditation.

Filmography

References

External links 
 

Indian actresses
1967 births
Living people